Muschleria is a genus of African flowering plants in the ironweed tribe within the daisy family.

The genus is named in honour of German botanist Reinhold Conrad Muschler (1882–1957).

Species
Muschleria angolensis S.Moore - Angola

formerly included
see Brachythrix 
Muschleria stolzii S.Moore - Brachythrix stolzii (S.Moore) Wild & G.V.Pope

References

Vernonieae
Monotypic Asteraceae genera
Flora of Angola